The 2002 NAIA Football Championship Series concluded on December 21, 2002 with the championship game played at Jim Carroll Stadium in Savannah, Tennessee.  The game was won by the Carroll Fighting Saints over the Georgetown Tigers by a score of 28–7.

Tournament bracket

  ** denotes Double OT.

See also
 2002 NAIA football rankings

References

 
NAIA Football National Championship
Carroll Fighting Saints football
Georgetown Tigers football
December 2002 sports events in the United States
NAIA football